"It's a Little Too Late" is a song co-written and recorded by American country music singer Mark Chesnutt.  It was released in September 1996 as the lead single from his Greatest Hits compilation album.  The song reached number-one on the U.S. Billboard Hot Country Singles & Tracks chart and peaked at number 5 on the Canadian RPM Country Tracks chart.  The song was written by Chesnutt, Roger Springer and Slugger Morrissette.

Content
The song describes a narrator whose woman had recently walked out on him, wanting him to be a better man. The narrator keeps stating in his mind that he should have done something for the woman: "I should've done this and I should've done that / I should've been there then she'd have never left / I should've been hangin' on to every word she ever had to say / But it's a little too late, she's a little too gone / She's a little too right, I'm a little too wrong / Now would be a good time to change / But it's a little too late."

In the second verse, the narrator states coming home late, and that his lover was not mad at him and thought she realized not worrying about him. The next morning, the narrator then finds her gone.

Critical reception
Deborah Evans Price, of Billboard magazine reviewed the song favorably, saying that the song "demonstrates that he can deliver the driving tempo records country radio seems to favor these days without sacrificing any of the traditional country flavor of the music."

Music video
The music video was directed by Richard Murray. It begins with a moving van pulling into the driveway of a house. Two guys hop out of the truck, and then, we see a man watching Claude "Fish" Fishburne hosting Go Fish on TNN. A woman then bangs a pair of cymbals to start the song. After we see the two guys moving a sofa into the house, Mark starts singing and playing guitar. The woman tries to interrupt the narrator from watching Go Fish on TNN. The movers then start packing everything out of the house, including the sofa that the narrator was sitting on, and the TV. The woman then gives her husband a fish and a rod, and he enjoys it, then goes to thank the movers for everything. After the moving van leaves, it starts to rain on the narrator.

Chart performance
This song was Chesnutt's seventh Billboard Number One country single. It entered the Hot Country Singles & Tracks chart at number 63 on the chart dated October 5, 1996, and climbed to Number One in its eighteenth chart week on the chart dated February 8, 1997, where it held the top spot for two weeks.

Year-end charts

References

1996 singles
1996 songs
Mark Chesnutt songs
Songs written by Roger Springer
Decca Records singles
Songs written by Mark Chesnutt
Song recordings produced by Tony Brown (record producer)